Akenhead is a surname. Notable people with the surname include:

 James Akenhead (born 1983), English poker player
 Robert Akenhead (born 1949), English judge

See also
 Aikenhead